Youcef Laouafi (born January 19, 1996) is an Algerian footballer who plays for Algerian Ligue Professionnelle 1 club CR Belouizdad.

Career
In 2018, Laouafi signes a three-year contract with ES Sétif.In 2021, Laouafi signes a three-year contract with ES Sahel.In 2022, he joined CR Belouizdad.

References

External links
 

Living people
1996 births
Algerian footballers
Association football forwards
Sportspeople from Skikda
ES Sétif players
MC El Eulma players
21st-century Algerian people
Algeria A' international footballers
2022 African Nations Championship players